Castle Lake may refer to:

Castle Lake (California), a glacially-formed cirque lake in Siskiyou County
Castle Lake (Idaho), an alpine lake in Custer County
Castle Lake (Nevada), a glacial tarn in Elko County
Castle Lake (Washington), a barrier lake formed by the 1980 eruption of Mount St. Helens
Castle Lake (Park County, Montana), a lake in Park County
Castle Lake (Meagher County, Montana), a lake in Meagher County
 Castle Lake, a reservoir in Henry County, Indiana